"Show Stopper" is the debut single by American girl group Danity Kane. It was written by Angela Hunte, Krystal Oliver, Calvin Puckett, Frank Romano, and Jim Jonsin for their self-titled debut album (2006), while production was helmed by Jonsin. The song It features guest vocals by rapper Yung Joc and was released as the album's lead single on March 3, 2006 in the United States and on October 20, 2006 in Europe. "Show Stopper" peaked at number 8 on the US Billboard Hot 100 chart. It also managed to enter the top 30 in Germany and charted in the top 20 on the Pop 100 chart, also earning top five status on the Digital Songs and Dance Club Play charts.

Chart performance 

The single was released on the U.S. iTunes Music Store on May 16, 2006. The following week "Show Stopper" debuted at number 17 on the Billboard Hot 100, becoming one of the highest debuts of 2006 behind Taylor Hicks's "Do I Make You Proud" and Beyoncé's "Ring the Alarm". While the song reached its peak position of number 8 in its second week, radio play and popularity on iTunes declined and it eventually fell out of the top 25. However, about five weeks after the radio release, the song finally started gathering airplay and subsequently moved back up the Hot 100, again peaking at number 12.

While the song failed to chart or sell noticeably in Austria, the song became a top 30 success in Germany with a peak position of number 27.

Music video

The music video for "Show Stopper" was directed by Dominican film maker  Jessy Terrero and was filmed in various locations throughout Los Angeles, California between June 27 and 28, 2006. The final version of the video premiered at the end of Making the Video on MTV on August 4, 2006. It reached a peak position of number two on TRL on September 8, 2006 and also finished number 6 on MTV's top videos of 2006 countdown.

Thematically, the video starts with the band members in the recording studio listening to their album cut "Want It" with Diddy as he tells them to go straight to bed and not go out and club hop. Then the girls go into a van and get "made up" and then go out on the town in expensive cars, looking for boys and flirting. The video ends with the girls dancing on the Hollywood Boulevard. 
Apart from rapper Yung Joc whose part was filmed inside his van while he was on his way back to the airport because of a lack of time, Diddy also recorded a sequence with his verse in the song which appears in the remix version of the music video and features only the girl's full dance portion of the original version.

Track listings 
These are the formats and track listings of major single releases of "Show Stopper".

International CD single
"Show Stopper" (Album Version)
"Show Stopper" (Remix) (featuring Diddy)
"Show Stopper" (Instrumental)
"Show Stopper" (Acapella)

Vinyl single
"Show Stopper" (Main version)
"Show Stopper" (Instrumental)
"Show Stopper" (Acapella)

Official remixes
"Show Stopper" (Alternate Version) – 4:15
"Show Stopper" (Bad Boy Remix) (featuring Diddy & Yung Joc) – 4:42
"Show Stopper" (Jim Jonsin Remix) (featuring Pitbull & B.o.B) – 4:13
"Show Stopper" (Dave Audé Club Mix) – 7:26
"Show Stopper" (Ford & Vidal Club Mix) – 6:31

Credits and personnel
Credits adapted from the liner notes of Danity Kane.

Sean "Diddy" Combs – executive producer
Joe Gonzalez – recording assistant
Angela Hunte – writer
Rob Marks – recording engineer
Krystal Oliver – writer

Harve Pierre – co-executive producer
Calvin Puckett – writer
Frank Romano – writer
Jim Jonsin – producer, writer

Charts

Weekly charts

Year-end charts

Release history

References

2006 debut singles
Danity Kane songs
Yung Joc songs
Bad Boy Records singles
Song recordings produced by Jim Jonsin
Songs written by Jim Jonsin
Songs written by Angela Hunte